Kareli may refer to:
Kareli, Allahabad, a neighborhood in Allahabad, Uttar Pradesh, India
Kareli District, a district of Georgia in the region of Shida Kartli
Kareli, Georgia, a town in Shida Kartli District
Kareli, Madhya Pradesh, a town in Narsinghpur district in Madhya Pradesh, India

See also

Karoli (name)